CD-194 or No. 194 was a Type D escort ship of the Imperial Japanese Navy during World War II.

History
She was laid down on 18 December 1944 at the Nagasaki shipyard of Mitsubishi Heavy Industries for the benefit of the Imperial Japanese Navy and launched on 15 February 1944. On 15 March 1945, she was completed and commissioned. On 15 August 1945, Japan announced their unconditional surrender and she was turned over to the Allies. On 5 October 1945, she was struck from the Navy List. She was assigned to the Allied Repatriation Service and went on several repatriation journeys.

On 6 July 1947, she was ceded to the Republic of China as a war reparation and renamed Weihai (威海).

On 23 April 1949, she was attacked an damage by gunfire on the Yangtze River and seized by forces of the People's Republic of China.

References

Bibliography

1945 ships
Type D escort ships
Ships built by Mitsubishi Heavy Industries
Ships of the People's Liberation Army Navy
Ships of the Republic of China Navy
Naval ships of China